Bob Niziolek (born June 30, 1958) is a former American football tight end. He played for the Detroit Lions in 1981, the Denver Gold from 1983 to 1984 and for the Orlando Renegades in 1985.

References

1958 births
Living people
Players of American football from Chicago
American football tight ends
Colorado Buffaloes football players
Detroit Lions players
Denver Gold players
Washington Federals/Orlando Renegades players